The European Convention on Human Rights (ECHR; formally the Convention for the Protection of Human Rights and Fundamental Freedoms) is an international convention to protect human rights and political freedoms in Europe.  Drafted in 1950 by the then newly formed Council of Europe, the convention entered into force on 3 September 1953. All Council of Europe member states are party to the Convention and new members are expected to ratify the convention at the earliest opportunity.

The Convention established the European Court of Human Rights (generally referred to by the initials ECtHR). Any person who feels their rights have been violated under the Convention by a state party can take a case to the Court. Judgments finding violations are binding on the States concerned and they are obliged to execute them. The Committee of Ministers of the Council of Europe monitors the execution of judgments, particularly to ensure payments awarded by the Court appropriately compensate applicants for the damage they have sustained.

The Convention has several protocols, which amend the convention framework.

The Convention has had a significant influence on the law in Council of Europe member countries and is widely considered the most effective international treaty for human rights protection.

History

The European Convention on Human Rights has played an important role in the development and awareness of human rights in Europe.
The development of a regional system of human rights protections operating across Europe can be seen as a direct response to twin concerns. First, in the aftermath of the Second World War, the convention, drawing on the inspiration of the Universal Declaration of Human Rights, can be seen as part of a wider response from the Allied powers in delivering a human rights agenda to prevent the most serious human rights violations which had occurred during the Second World War from happening again.

Second, the Convention was a response to the growth of Stalinism in Central and Eastern Europe and was designed to protect the member states of the Council of Europe from communist subversion. This, in part, explains the constant references to values and principles that are "necessary in a democratic society" throughout the Convention, despite the fact that such principles are not in any way defined within the convention itself.

From 7 to 10 May 1948, politicians including Winston Churchill, François Mitterrand, and Konrad Adenauer; civil society representatives; academics; business leaders; trade unionists; and religious leaders convened the Congress of Europe in The Hague. At the end of the Congress, a declaration and following pledge to create the Convention was issued. The second and third Articles of the Pledge state: "We desire a Charter of Human Rights guaranteeing liberty of thought, assembly and expression as well as right to form a political opposition. We desire a Court of Justice with adequate sanctions for the implementation of this Charter."

The Convention was drafted by the Council of Europe after the Second World War and Hague Congress. Over 100 parliamentarians from the twelve member states of the Council of Europe gathered in Strasbourg in the summer of 1949 for the first-ever meeting of the Council's Consultative Assembly to draft a "charter of human rights" and to establish a court to enforce it. British MP and lawyer Sir David Maxwell-Fyfe, the Chair of the Assembly's Committee on Legal and Administrative Questions, was one of its leading members and guided the drafting of the Convention, based on an earlier draft produced by the European Movement. As a prosecutor at the Nuremberg Trials, he had seen first-hand how international justice could be effectively applied. 

French former minister and Resistance fighter Pierre-Henri Teitgen submitted a report to the Assembly proposing a list of rights to be protected, selecting a number from the Universal Declaration of Human Rights that had recently been agreed to in New York, and defining how the enforcing judicial mechanism might operate. After extensive debates, the Assembly sent its final proposal to the Council's Committee of Ministers, which convened a group of experts to draft the Convention itself.

The Convention was designed to incorporate a traditional civil liberties approach to securing "effective political democracy", from the strongest traditions in the United Kingdom, France and other member states of the fledgling Council of Europe, as said by Guido Raimondi, President of the European Court of Human Rights:

The Convention was opened for signature on 4 November 1950 in Rome. It was ratified and entered into force on 3 September 1953. It is overseen and enforced by the European Court of Human Rights in Strasbourg, and the Council of Europe. Until procedural reforms in the late 1990s, the Convention was also overseen by a European Commission on Human Rights.

Drafting
The Convention is drafted in broad terms, in a similar (albeit more modern) manner to the 1689 Scottish Claim of Right Act 1689, to the 1689 English Bill of Rights, the 1791 U.S. Bill of Rights, the 1789 French Declaration of the Rights of Man and of the Citizen, or the first part of the German Basic Law. Statements of principle are, from a legal point of view, not determinative and require extensive interpretation by courts to bring out meaning in particular factual situations.

Convention articles
As amended by Protocol 11, the Convention consists of three parts. The main rights and freedoms are contained in Section I, which consists of Articles 2 to 18. Section II (Articles 19 to 51) sets up the Court and its rules of operation. Section III contains various concluding provisions.

Before the entry into force of Protocol 11, Section II (Article 19) set up the Commission and the Court, Sections III (Articles 20 to 37) and IV (Articles 38 to 59) included the high-level machinery for the operation of, respectively, the Commission and the Court, and Section V contained various concluding provisions.

Many of the Articles in Section I are structured in two paragraphs: the first sets out a basic right or freedom (such as Article 2(1) – the right to life) but the second contains various exclusions, exceptions or limitations on the basic right (such as Article 2(2) – which excepts certain uses of force leading to death).

Article 1 – respecting rights

Article 1 simply binds the signatory parties to secure the rights under the other Articles of the Convention "within their jurisdiction". In exceptional cases, "jurisdiction" may not be confined to a Contracting State's own national territory; the obligation to secure Convention rights then also extends to foreign territories, such as occupied land in which the State exercises effective control.

In Loizidou v Turkey, the European Court of Human Rights ruled that jurisdiction of member states to the convention extended to areas under that state's effective control as a result of military action.

Article 2 – life

Article 2 protects the right of every person to their life. The right to life extends only to human beings, not to animals, or to "legal persons" such as corporations. In Evans v United Kingdom, the Court ruled that the question of whether the right to life extends to a human embryo fell within a state's margin of appreciation. In Vo v France, the Court declined to extend the right to life to an unborn child, while stating that "it is neither desirable, nor even possible as matters stand, to answer in the abstract the question whether the unborn child is a person for the purposes of Article 2 of the Convention".

The Court has ruled that states have three main duties under Article 2:

 a duty to refrain from unlawful killing,
 a duty to investigate suspicious deaths, and
 in certain circumstances, a positive duty to prevent foreseeable loss of life.

The first paragraph of the article contains an exception for lawful executions, although this exception has largely been superseded by Protocols 6 and 13. Protocol 6 prohibits the imposition of the death penalty in peacetime, while Protocol 13 extends the prohibition to all circumstances. (For more on Protocols 6 and 13, see below).

The second paragraph of Article 2 provides that death resulting from defending oneself or others, arresting a suspect or fugitive, or suppressing riots or insurrections, will not contravene the Article when the use of force involved is "no more than absolutely necessary".

Signatory states to the Convention can only derogate from the rights contained in Article 2 for deaths which result from lawful acts of war.

The European Court of Human Rights did not rule upon the right to life until 1995, when in McCann and Others v United Kingdom it ruled that the exception contained in the second paragraph does not constitute situations when it is permitted to kill, but situations where it is permitted to use force which might result in the deprivation of life.

Article 3 – torture

Article 3 prohibits torture and "inhuman or degrading treatment or punishment". There are no exceptions or limitations on this right. This provision usually applies, apart from torture, to cases of severe police violence and poor conditions in detention.

The Court has emphasized the fundamental nature of Article 3 in holding that the prohibition is made in "absolute terms ... irrespective of a victim's conduct". The Court has also held that states cannot deport or extradite individuals who might be subjected to torture, inhuman or degrading treatment or punishment, in the recipient state.

The first case to examine Article 3 was the Greek case, which set an influential precedent. In Ireland v. United Kingdom (1979–1980) the Court ruled that the five techniques developed by the United Kingdom (wall-standing, hooding, subjection to noise, deprivation of sleep, and deprivation of food and drink), as used against fourteen detainees in Northern Ireland by the United Kingdom were "inhuman and degrading" and breached the European Convention on Human Rights, but did not amount to "torture".

In Aksoy v. Turkey (1997) the Court found Turkey guilty of torture in 1996 in the case of a detainee who was suspended by his arms while his hands were tied behind his back.

Selmouni v. France (2000) the Court has appeared to be more open to finding states guilty of torture ruling that since the Convention is a "living instrument", treatment which it had previously characterized as inhuman or degrading treatment might in future be regarded as torture.

In 2014, after new information was uncovered that showed the decision to use the five techniques in Northern Ireland in 1971–1972 had been taken by British ministers, the Irish Government asked the European Court of Human Rights to review its judgement. In 2018, by six votes to one, the Court declined.

Article 4 – servitude

Article 4 prohibits slavery, servitude and forced labour but exempts labour:
 done as a normal part of imprisonment,
 in the form of compulsory military service or work done as an alternative by conscientious objectors,
 required to be done during a state of emergency, and
 considered to be a part of a person's normal "civic obligations".

Article 5 – liberty and security

Article 5 provides that everyone has the right to liberty and security of person. Liberty and security of the person are taken as a "compound" concept – security of the person has not been subject to separate interpretation by the Court.

Article 5 provides the right to liberty, subject only to lawful arrest or detention under certain other circumstances, such as arrest on reasonable suspicion of a crime or imprisonment in fulfilment of a sentence. The article also provides those arrested with the right to be informed, in a language they understand, of the reasons for the arrest and any charge they face, the right of prompt access to judicial proceedings to determine the legality of the arrest or detention, to trial within a reasonable time or release pending trial, and the right to compensation in the case of arrest or detention in violation of this article.
 Assanidze v. Georgia, App. No. 71503/01 (Eur. Ct. H.R. 8 April 2004)

Article 6 – fair trial

Article 6 provides a detailed right to a fair trial, including the right to a public hearing before an independent and impartial tribunal within reasonable time, the presumption of innocence, and other minimum rights for those charged with a criminal offence (adequate time and facilities to prepare their defence, access to legal representation, right to examine witnesses against them or have them examined, right to the free assistance of an interpreter).

The majority of convention violations that the court finds today are excessive delays, in violation of the "reasonable time" requirement, in civil and criminal proceedings before national courts, mostly in Italy and France. Under the "independent tribunal" requirement, the court has ruled that military judges in Turkish state security courts are incompatible with Article 6. In compliance with this Article, Turkey has now adopted a law abolishing these courts.

Another significant set of violations concerns the "confrontation clause" of Article 6 (i.e. the right to examine witnesses or have them examined). In this respect, problems of compliance with Article 6 may arise when national laws allow the use in evidence of the testimonies of absent, anonymous and vulnerable witnesses.
 Steel v. United Kingdom (1998) 28 EHRR 603
 Assanidze v. Georgia [2004] ECHR 140
 Othman (Abu Qatada) v. United Kingdom (2012) – Abu Qatada could not be deported to Jordan as that would be a violation of Article 6 "given the real risk of the admission of evidence obtained by torture". This was the first time the court ruled that such an expulsion would be a violation of Article 6.

Article 7 – retroactivity

Article 7 prohibits the retroactive criminalisation of acts and omissions. No person may be punished for an act that was not a criminal offence at the time of its commission. The article states that a criminal offence is one under either national or international law, which would permit a party to prosecute someone for a crime which was not illegal under domestic law at the time, so long as it was prohibited by international law. The Article also prohibits a heavier penalty being imposed than was applicable at the time when the criminal act was committed.

Article 7 incorporates the legal principle nullum crimen, nulla poena sine lege (no crime, no penalty without law) into the convention.

Relevant cases are:
 Kokkinakis v. Greece [1993] ECHR 20
 S.A.S. v. France [2014] ECHR 69

Article 8 – privacy

Article 8 provides a right to respect for one's "private and family life, his home and his correspondence", subject to certain restrictions that are "in accordance with law" and "necessary in a democratic society". This article clearly provides a right to be free of unlawful searches, but the Court has given the protection for "private and family life" that this article provides a broad interpretation, taking for instance that prohibition of private consensual homosexual acts violates this article. There have been cases discussing consensual familial sexual relationships, and how the criminalisation of this may violate this article. However, the ECHR still allows such familial sexual acts to be criminal. 

This may be compared to the jurisprudence of the United States Supreme Court, which has also adopted a somewhat broad interpretation of the right to privacy. Furthermore, Article 8 sometimes comprises positive obligations: whereas classical human rights are formulated as prohibiting a State from interfering with rights, and thus not to do something (e.g. not to separate a family under family life protection), the effective enjoyment of such rights may also include an obligation for the State to become active, and to do something (e.g. to enforce access for a divorced parent to his/her child).

Notable cases:
 Zakharov v. Russia [2015] EHCR 47143/06
 Malone v. United Kingdom [1984] ECHR 10, (1984) 7 EHRR 14
 Oliari and Others v. Italy (2015)

Article 9 – conscience and religion

Article 9 provides a right to freedom of thought, conscience and religion. This includes the freedom to change a religion or belief, and to manifest a religion or belief in worship, teaching, practice and observance, subject to certain restrictions that are "in accordance with law" and "necessary in a democratic society".

Relevant cases are:
 Kokkinakis v. Greece [1993] ECHR 20
 Universelles Leben e.V. v. Germany [1996] (app. no. 29745/96)
 Buscarini and Others v. San Marino [1999] ECHR 7 
 Pichon and Sajous v. France [2001] ECHR 898
 Leyla Şahin v. Turkey [2004] ECHR 299
 Leela Förderkreis E.V. and Others v. Germany [2008] ECHR
 Lautsi v. Italy [2011] ECHR 2412
 S.A.S. v. France [2014] ECHR 695
 Eweida v. United Kingdom [2013] ECHR 2013

Article 10 – expression

Article 10 provides the right to freedom of expression, subject to certain restrictions that are "in accordance with law" and "necessary in a democratic society". This right includes the freedom to hold opinions, and to receive and impart information and ideas, but allows restrictions for:
 interests of national security
 territorial integrity or public safety
 prevention of disorder or crime
 protection of health or morals
 protection of the reputation or the rights of others
 preventing the disclosure of information received in confidence
 maintaining the authority and impartiality of the judiciary

Relevant cases are:
 Lingens v. Austria (1986) 8 EHRR 407
 The Observer and The Guardian v. United Kingdom (1991) 14 EHRR 153, the "Spycatcher" case.
 Bowman v. United Kingdom [1998] ECHR 4, (1998) 26 EHRR 1, distributing vast quantities of anti-abortion material in contravention of election spending laws
 Communist Party v. Turkey (1998) 26 EHRR 1211
 Appleby v. United Kingdom (2003) 37 EHRR 38, protests in a private shopping centre
 TV Vest and Rogaland Pensioners Party v. Norway (2008)

Article 11 – association

Article 11 protects the right to freedom of assembly and association, including the right to form trade unions, subject to certain restrictions that are "in accordance with law" and "necessary in a democratic society".
 Vogt v. Germany (1995)
 Yazar, Karatas, Aksoy and Hep v. Turkey (2003) 36 EHRR 59
 Bączkowski v. Poland (2005)

Article 12 – marriage

Article 12 provides a right for women and men of marriageable age to marry and establish a family.

Despite a number of invitations, the Court has so far refused to apply the protections of this article to same-sex marriage. The Court has defended this on the grounds that the article was intended to apply only to different-sex marriage, and that a wide margin of appreciation must be granted to parties in this area.

In Goodwin v. United Kingdom the Court ruled that a law which still classified post-operative transsexual persons under their pre-operative sex violated article 12 as it meant that transsexual persons were unable to marry individuals of their post-operative opposite sex. This reversed an earlier ruling in Rees v. United Kingdom. This did not, however, alter the Court's understanding that Article 12 protects only different-sex couples.

The European Court of Human Rights ruled in Schalk and Kopf v. Austria that countries are not required to provide marriage licenses for same-sex couples; however, if a country allows same-sex couple marriage it must be done under the same conditions that opposite-sex couples marriage face, in order to prevent a breach of article 14 – the prohibition of discrimination. Additionally, the court ruled in the 2015 case of Oliari and Others v. Italy that states have a positive obligation to ensure there is a specific legal framework for the recognition and protection of same-sex couples.

Article 13 – effective remedy
Article 13 provides for the right for an effective remedy before national authorities for violations of rights under the Convention. The inability to obtain a remedy before a national court for an infringement of a Convention right is thus a free-standing and separately actionable infringement of the Convention.

Article 14 – discrimination

Article 14 contains a prohibition of discrimination. This prohibition is broad in some ways and narrow in others. It is broad in that it prohibits discrimination under a potentially unlimited number of grounds. While the article specifically prohibits discrimination based on "sex, race, colour, language, religion, political or other opinions, national or social origin, association with a national minority, property, birth or other status", the last of these allows the court to extend to Article 14 protection to other grounds not specifically mentioned such as has been done regarding discrimination based on a person's sexual orientation.

At the same time, the article's protection is limited in that it only prohibits discrimination with respect to rights under the Convention. Thus, an applicant must prove discrimination in the enjoyment of a specific right that is guaranteed elsewhere in the Convention (e.g. discrimination based on sex – Article 14 – in the enjoyment of the right to freedom of expression – Article 10).

Protocol 12 extends this prohibition to cover discrimination in any legal right, even when that legal right is not protected under the Convention, so long as it is provided for in national law.

Article 15 – derogations

Article 15 allows contracting states to derogate from certain rights guaranteed by the Convention in a time of "war or other public emergency threatening the life of the nation". Permissible derogations under article 15 must meet three substantive conditions:

 there must be a public emergency threatening the life of the nation;
 any measures taken in response must be "strictly required by the exigencies of the situation"; and
 the measures taken in response to it must be in compliance with a state's other obligations under international law.

In addition to these substantive requirements, the derogation must be procedurally sound. There must be some formal announcement of the derogation and notice of the derogation and any measures adopted under it, and the ending of the derogation must be communicated to the Secretary-General of the Council of Europe.

As of 2016, eight member states had ever invoked derogations. The Court is quite permissive in accepting a state's derogations from the Convention but applies a higher degree of scrutiny in deciding whether measures taken by states under a derogation are, in the words of Article 15, "strictly required by the exigencies of the situation". Thus in A v United Kingdom, the Court dismissed a claim that a derogation lodged by the British government in response to the September 11 attacks was invalid, but went on to find that measures taken by the United Kingdom under that derogation were disproportionate.

Examples of such derogations include:
 In the 1969 Greek case, the European Commission of Human Rights ruled that the derogation was invalid because the alleged Communist subversion did not pose a sufficient threat. This is the only time to date that the Convention system has rejected an attempted derogation.
 Operation Demetrius—Internees arrested without trial pursuant to "Operation Demetrius" could not complain to the European Commission of Human Rights about breaches of Article 5 because on 27 June 1975, the UK lodged a notice with the Council of Europe declaring that there was a "public emergency within the meaning of Article 15(1) of the Convention".

Article 16 – foreign parties
Article 16 allows states to restrict the political activity of foreigners. The Court has ruled that European Union member states cannot consider the nationals of other member states to be aliens.

Article 17 – abuse of rights
Article 17 provides that no one may use the rights guaranteed by the Convention to seek the abolition or limitation of rights guaranteed in the Convention. This addresses instances where states seek to restrict a human right in the name of another human right, or where individuals rely on a human right to undermine other human rights (for example where an individual issues a death threat).
 Communist Party of Germany v. the Federal Republic of Germany (1957), the Commission refused to consider the appeal by the Communist Party of Germany, stating that the communist doctrine advocated by them is incompatible with the convention, citing article 17's limitations on the rights to the extent necessarily to prevent their subversion by adherents of a totalitarian doctrine.

Article 18 – permitted restrictions

Article 18 provides that any limitations on the rights provided for in the Convention may be used only for the purpose for which they are provided. For example, Article 5, which guarantees the right to personal freedom, may be explicitly limited in order to bring a suspect before a judge. To use pre-trial detention as a means of intimidation of a person under a false pretext is, therefore, a limitation of right (to freedom) which does not serve an explicitly provided purpose (to be brought before a judge), and is therefore contrary to Article 18.

Convention protocols
, fifteen protocols to the Convention have been opened for signature. These can be divided into two main groups: those amending the framework of the convention system, and those expanding the rights that can be protected. The former require unanimous ratification by member states before coming into force, while the latter require a certain number of states to sign before coming into force.

Protocol 1
This Protocol contains three different rights which the signatories could not agree to place in the Convention itself. Monaco and Switzerland have signed but never ratified Protocol 1.

Article 1 – property
Article 1 ("A1P1") provides that "every natural or legal person is entitled to the peaceful enjoyment of his possessions". The European Court of Human Rights acknowledged a violation of the fair balance between the demands of the general interest of the community and the requirements of the protection of the individual's fundamental rights, also, in the uncertainty – for the owner – about the future of the property, and in the absence of an allowance.

In the case of Mifsud and others v Malta (38770/17) the Maltese state was found to have violated Article 1 of Protocol No. 1 to the Convention. The case involved a plot of land owned by the Mifsud family and their heirs which was expropriated twice (in 1984 and in 2012). The Court, in its judgment, stated that "the (Maltese) Constitutional Court had no basis on which to ground its finding. The Court is disconcerted by the circumstances of the present case which led to an expropriation of property being endorsed without anyone being able to assert the reasons behind such an expropriation."

Article 2 – education
Article 2 provides for the right not to be denied an education and the right for parents to have their children educated in accordance with their religious and other views. It does not however guarantee any particular level of education of any particular quality.

Although phrased in the Protocol as a negative right, in Şahin v. Turkey the Court ruled that:

Article 3 – elections
Article 3 provides for the right to elections performed by secret ballot, that are also free and that occur at regular intervals.
 Matthews v. United Kingdom (1999) 28 EHRR 361

Protocol 4 – civil imprisonment, free movement, expulsion
Article 1 prohibits the imprisonment of people for inability to fulfil a contract. Article 2 provides for a right to freely move within a country once lawfully there and for a right to leave any country. Article 3 prohibits the expulsion of nationals and provides for the right of an individual to enter a country of their nationality. Article 4 prohibits the collective expulsion of foreigners.

Turkey and the United Kingdom have signed but never ratified Protocol 4. Greece and Switzerland have neither signed nor ratified this protocol.

The United Kingdom's failure to ratify this protocol is due to concerns over the interaction of Article 2 and Article 3 with British nationality law. Specifically, several classes of "British national" (such as British National (Overseas)) do not have the right of abode in the United Kingdom and are subject to immigration control there. In 2009, the UK government stated that it had no plans to ratify Protocol 4 because of concerns that those articles could be taken as conferring that right.

Protocol 6 – restriction of death penalty
Requires parties to restrict the application of the death penalty except for "acts committed in time of war" or of "imminent threat of war".

Every Council of Europe member state has signed and ratified Protocol 6.

Protocol 7 – crime and family
 Article 1 provides for a right to fair procedures for lawfully resident foreigners facing expulsion.
 Article 2 provides for the right to appeal in criminal matters.
 Article 3 provides for compensation for the victims of miscarriages of justice.
 Article 4 prohibits the re-trial of anyone who has already been finally acquitted or convicted of a particular offence (double jeopardy).
 Article 5 provides for equality between spouses.

Despite having signed the protocol more than thirty years ago Germany and the Netherlands have never ratified it. Turkey, which signed the protocol in 1985, ratified it in 2016, becoming the latest member state to do so. The United Kingdom has neither signed nor ratified the protocol.

Protocol 12 – discrimination

Protocol 12 applies the current expansive and indefinite grounds of prohibited discrimination in Article 14 to the exercise of any legal right and to the actions (including the obligations) of public authorities.

The Protocol entered into force on 1 April 2005 and has been ratified by 20 member states. Several member states—Bulgaria, Denmark, France, Lithuania, Monaco, Poland, Sweden, Switzerland, and the United Kingdom—have not signed the protocol.

The United Kingdom government has declined to sign Protocol 12 on the basis that they believe the wording of protocol is too wide and would result in a flood of new cases testing the extent of the new provision. They believe that the phrase "rights set forth by law" might include international conventions to which the UK is not a party, and would result in incorporation of these instruments by stealth.

It has been suggested that the protocol is therefore in a catch-22, since the UK will decline to either sign or ratify the protocol until the European Court of Human Rights has addressed the meaning of the provision, while the court is hindered in doing so by the lack of applications to the court concerning the protocol caused by the decisions of Europe's most populous states—including the UK—not to ratify the protocol. The UK government, nevertheless, stated in 2004 that it  "agrees in principle that the ECHR should contain a provision against discrimination that is free-standing and not parasitic on the other Convention rights". The first judgment that found a violation of Protocol No. 12, Sejdić and Finci v. Bosnia and Herzegovina, was delivered in 2009.

Protocol 13 – complete abolition of death penalty
Protocol 13 provides for the total abolition of the death penalty. Currently all Council of Europe member states but two have ratified Protocol 13. Armenia has signed but not ratified the protocol. Azerbaijan has not signed it.

Procedural and institutional protocols
The Convention's provisions affecting institutional and procedural matters have been altered several times by means of protocols. These amendments have, with the exception of Protocol 2, amended the text of the convention. Protocol 2 did not amend the text of the convention as such but stipulated that it was to be treated as an integral part of the text. All of these protocols have required the unanimous ratification of all the member states of the Council of Europe to enter into force.

Protocol 11
Protocols 2, 3, 5, 8, 9 and 10 have now been superseded by Protocol 11 which entered into force on 1 November 1998. It established a fundamental change in the machinery of the convention. It abolished the Commission, allowing individuals to apply directly to the Court, which was given compulsory jurisdiction and altered the latter's structure. Previously states could ratify the Convention without accepting the jurisdiction of the Court of Human Rights. The protocol also abolished the judicial functions of the Committee of Ministers.

Protocol 14

Protocol 14 follows on from Protocol 11 in proposing to further improve the efficiency of the Court. It seeks to "filter" out cases that have less chance of succeeding along with those that are broadly similar to cases brought previously against the same member state. Furthermore, a case will not be considered admissible where an applicant has not suffered a "significant disadvantage". This latter ground can only be used when an examination of the application on the merits is not considered necessary and where the subject-matter of the application had already been considered by a national court.

A new mechanism was introduced by Protocol 14 to assist enforcement of judgements by the Committee of Ministers. The Committee can ask the Court for an interpretation of a judgement and can even bring a member state before the Court for non-compliance of a previous judgement against that state. Protocol 14 also allows for European Union accession to the Convention. The protocol has been ratified by every Council of Europe member state, Russia being last in February 2010. It entered into force on 1 June 2010.

A provisional Protocol 14bis had been opened for signature in 2009. Pending the ratification of Protocol 14 itself, 14bis was devised to allow the Court to implement revised procedures in respect of the states which have ratified it. It allowed single judges to reject manifestly inadmissible applications made against the states that have ratified the protocol. It also extended the competence of three-judge chambers to declare applications made against those states admissible and to decide on their merits where there already is a well-established case law of the Court. Now that all Council of Europe member states have ratified Protocol 14, Protocol 14bis has lost its raison d'être and according to its own terms ceased to have any effect when Protocol 14 entered into force on 1 June 2010.

See also
 Strasbourg Observers
 Capital punishment in Europe
 Charter of Fundamental Rights of the European Union
 European Social Charter
 Human Rights Act 1998 for how the Convention has been incorporated into the law of the United Kingdom.
 Human rights in Europe
 Territorial scope of European Convention on Human Rights
 European Convention on Human Rights Act 2003 Irish Act similar to the British Human Rights Act 1998.
 International Institute of Human Rights
 United Kingdom constitutional law

Notes

Further reading
 
 
 
 
 
 Kälin W., Künzli J. (2019). The Law of International Human Rights Protection. .

External links

 Official text of the European Convention on Human Rights
 Protocols to the Convention for the Protection of Human Rights and Fundamental Freedoms
 Database of European Human Rights Court (Strasbourg) judgments
 

 
Human rights instruments
Convention on Human Rights
1950 in Italy
1950s in Rome
Anti–death penalty treaties
Treaties concluded in 1950
Treaties entered into force in 1953
Treaties of Albania
Treaties of Andorra
Treaties of Armenia
Treaties of Austria
Treaties of Azerbaijan
Treaties of Belgium
Treaties of Bosnia and Herzegovina
Treaties of Bulgaria
Treaties of Croatia
Treaties of Cyprus
Treaties of the Czech Republic
Treaties of Denmark
Treaties of Estonia
Treaties of Finland
Treaties of France
Treaties of Georgia (country)
Treaties of West Germany
Treaties of Greece
Treaties of Hungary
Treaties of Iceland
Treaties of Ireland
Treaties of Italy
Treaties of Latvia
Treaties of Liechtenstein
Treaties of Lithuania
Treaties of Luxembourg
Treaties of Malta
Treaties of Moldova
Treaties of Monaco
Treaties of Montenegro
Treaties of the Netherlands
Treaties of Norway
Treaties of Poland
Treaties of Portugal
Treaties of Romania
Treaties of Russia
Treaties of San Marino
Treaties of Serbia and Montenegro
Treaties of Slovakia
Treaties of Slovenia
Treaties of Spain
Treaties of Sweden
Treaties of Switzerland
Treaties of North Macedonia
Treaties of Turkey
Treaties of Ukraine
Treaties of the United Kingdom